Subsidiary protection is international protection for persons seeking asylum who do not qualify as refugees. In European law, Directive 2004/83/EC defines the minimum standards for qualifying for subsidiary protection status. The Directive was later added to with Directive 2011/95/EU, which states that uniform, European states for persons eligible for subsidiary protection and the content of the protection granted.

In the European Union, a person eligible for subsidiary protection status means a third country national or stateless who would face a real risk of suffering serious harm if s/he returned to the country of origin. Serious harm is defined as the risk of: "(a) death penalty or execution; or (b) torture or inhuman or degrading treatment or punishment of an applicant in the country of origin; or (c) serious and individual threat to a civilian's life or person by reasons of indiscriminate violence in situations of international or internal armed conflict."

According to the Universal Declaration of Human Rights, everyone has a right to seek asylum from persecution. The person granted refugee status, however, is defined by the Convention and Protocol Relating to the Status of Refugees as a person who risks being persecuted for reasons of race, religion, nationality, membership of a particular social group or political opinion in his or her country of origin.

Exclusions from Subsidiary Protection Status 

A person is excluded from subsidiary protection if the European Member State believes that s/he has committed a serious crime there, is guilty of acts contrary the Charter of the United Nations' article 1 and 2, or if s/he is a danger to the society, or if s/he has committed a crime against humanity.

Furthermore, the subsidiary protection status may be removed from persons when the circumstances leading to the protection status have ceased to exist or have changed so that the person no longer faces a risk of serious harm.

References 

Right of asylum in the European Union

de:Subsidiärer Schutz